In mathematics, the Korteweg–De Vries (KdV) equation is a mathematical model of waves on shallow water surfaces. It is particularly notable as the prototypical example of an exactly solvable model, that is, a non-linear partial differential equation whose solutions can be exactly and precisely specified. KdV can be solved by means of the inverse scattering transform. The mathematical theory behind the KdV equation is a topic of active research.

Definition

The KdV equation is a nonlinear, dispersive partial differential equation for a function  of two dimensionless real variables, x and t which are proportional to space and time respectively:

with ∂x and ∂t denoting partial derivatives with respect to x and t.

Soliton solutions

Consider solutions in which a fixed wave form (given by f(X)) maintains its shape as it travels to the right at phase speed c.  Such a solution is given by  Substituting it into the KdV equation gives the ordinary differential equation

or, integrating with respect to X,

where A is a constant of integration.  Interpreting the independent variable X above as a virtual time variable, this means f satisfies Newton's equation of motion of a particle of unit mass in a cubic potential

If

then the potential function V(f) has local maximum at f = 0, there is a solution in which f(X) starts at this point at 'virtual time' −∞, eventually slides down to the local minimum, then back up the other side, reaching an equal height, then reverses direction, ending up at the local maximum again at time ∞.  In other words,  f(X) approaches  0 as X → ±∞.  This is the characteristic shape of the solitary wave solution.

More precisely, the solution is

where sech stands for the hyperbolic secant and a is an arbitrary constant. This describes a right-moving soliton.

Integrals of motion

The KdV equation has infinitely many integrals of motion , which do not change with time. They can be given explicitly as

where the polynomials Pn are defined recursively by

The first few integrals of motion are:
 the mass 
 the momentum 
 the energy 
Only the odd-numbered terms P(2n+1) result in non-trivial (meaning non-zero) integrals of motion .

Lax pairs

The KdV equation

can be reformulated as the Lax equation

with L a Sturm–Liouville operator:

and this accounts for the infinite number of first integrals of the KdV equation .

Least action principle

The Korteweg–De Vries equation

is the Euler–Lagrange equation of motion derived from the Lagrangian density, 

with  defined by

Since the Lagrangian (eq (1)) contains second derivatives, the Euler–Lagrange equation of motion for this field is

where  is a derivative with respect to the  component.

Evaluate the five terms of eq (3) by plugging in eq (1),

Remember the definition , so use that to simplify the above terms,

Finally, plug these three non-zero terms back into eq (3) to see

which is exactly the KdV equation

Long-time asymptotics

It can be shown that any sufficiently fast decaying smooth solution will eventually split into a finite superposition of solitons travelling to the right plus a decaying dispersive part travelling to the left.

History

The history of the KdV equation  started with experiments by John Scott Russell in 1834, followed by theoretical investigations by Lord Rayleigh and Joseph Boussinesq around 1870 and, finally, Korteweg and De Vries in 1895.

The KdV equation was not studied much after this until  discovered numerically that its solutions seemed to decompose at large times into a collection of "solitons": well separated  solitary waves. Moreover, the solitons seems to be almost unaffected in shape by passing through each other (though this could cause a change in their position).  They also made the connection to earlier numerical experiments by Fermi, Pasta, Ulam, and Tsingou by showing that the KdV equation was the continuum limit of the FPUT system.  Development of the analytic solution by means of the inverse scattering transform was done in 1967 by Gardner, Greene, Kruskal and Miura.

The KdV equation is now seen to be closely connected to Huygens' principle.

Applications and connections

The KdV equation has several connections to physical problems.  In addition to being the governing equation of the string in the Fermi–Pasta–Ulam–Tsingou problem in the continuum limit, it approximately describes the evolution of long, one-dimensional waves in many physical settings, including:
 shallow-water waves with weakly non-linear restoring forces,
 long internal waves in a density-stratified ocean,
 ion acoustic waves in a plasma,
 acoustic waves on a crystal lattice.

The KdV equation can also be solved using the inverse scattering transform such as those applied to the non-linear Schrödinger equation.

KdV equation and the Gross–Pitaevskii equation 

Considering the simplified solutions of the form

we obtain the KdV equation as

or

Integrating and taking the special case in which the integration constant is zero, we have:

which is the  special case of the generalized stationary Gross–Pitaevskii equation (GPE)

Therefore, for the certain class of solutions of generalized GPE ( for the true one-dimensional condensate and
 while using the three dimensional equation in one dimension), two equations are one. Furthermore, taking the  case with the minus sign and the  real, one obtains an attractive self-interaction that should yield a bright soliton.

Variations

Many different variations of the KdV equations have been studied. Some are listed in the following table.

q-analogs

See also

 Benjamin–Bona–Mahony equation
 Boussinesq approximation (water waves)
 Cnoidal wave
 Dispersion (water waves)
 Dispersionless equation
 Fifth-order Korteweg–De Vries equation
 Kadomtsev–Petviashvili equation
 Modified KdV–Burgers equation
 Novikov–Veselov equation
 Seventh-order Korteweg–De Vries equation
 Ursell number
 Vector soliton

Notes

References

 
 , 2 Parts, 967 pages

External links

 Korteweg–De Vries equation at EqWorld: The World of Mathematical Equations.
 Korteweg–De Vries equation at NEQwiki, the nonlinear equations encyclopedia.
 Cylindrical Korteweg–De Vries equation at EqWorld: The World of Mathematical Equations.
 Modified Korteweg–De Vries equation at EqWorld: The World of Mathematical Equations.
 Modified Korteweg–De Vries equation at NEQwiki, the nonlinear equations encyclopedia.
 
 Derivation of the Korteweg–De Vries equation for a narrow canal.
Three Solitons Solution of KdV Equation – 
Three Solitons (unstable) Solution of KdV Equation – 
Mathematical aspects of equations of Korteweg–De Vries type are discussed on the Dispersive PDE Wiki.
 Solitons from the Korteweg–De Vries Equation by  S. M. Blinder, The Wolfram Demonstrations Project.
 Solitons & Nonlinear Wave Equations

Partial differential equations
Exactly solvable models
Integrable systems
Solitons
Equations of fluid dynamics